The 1994–95 Iraqi National Clubs First Division was the 21st season of the competition since its foundation in 1974. The league title was won by Al-Zawraa for the second time in a row, and they also won the Iraq FA Cup for the third consecutive time. Half of the league's competing teams were relegated in order to result in a 12-team league for the next campaign. In this season, three points were given for a win instead of two points, and four points were given for a win by three goals or more.

League table

Results

Season statistics

Top scorers

Hat-tricks

Notes
4 Player scored 4 goals
5 Player scored 5 goals
6 Player scored 6 goals

References

External links
 Iraq Football Association

Iraqi Premier League seasons
1994–95 in Iraqi football
Iraq